"Mercy" (stylized as "Mercy.1" on the album) is a song by American hip hop artist Kanye West featuring GOOD Music rappers Big Sean and Pusha T, along with their Def Jam label-mate rapper 2 Chainz. The song, released April 3, 2012, serves as the lead single from the compilation album Cruel Summer (2012). The song's production was handled by Lifted, with additional production from West, Mike Dean and Mike Will Made It, and additional instrumentation from Hudson Mohawke. The song heavily samples the dancehall song "Dust a Sound Boy" by Super Beagle. The song received mostly positive reviews from music critics who praised the bombastic production, the varying quality of the verses, and the wordplay of the individual rappers. The song was featured on the soundtrack for NBA 2K13.

The song peaked at number 13 on the US Billboard Hot 100 and hit number one on both the US Billboard Hot Rap Songs and Hot R&B/Hip-Hop Songs charts. The song has since been certified sextuple platinum for six million digital sales in the US as of August 2016. A music video directed by Australian director Nabil Elderkin was released on June 6, 2012. The highly stylized video shows a long take of all four rappers featured on the song, along with other GOOD Music recording artists such as Cyhi the Prynce, Kid Cudi, Mr. Hudson and Teyana Taylor in cameos. The video features the rappers giving their verses and dancing around, with deliberate editing to make it appear as if they are disappearing and reappearing behind walls. The video received positive reviews from critics.

West performed his portion of the song at the 2012 Watch the Throne Tour, and 2 Chainz, Pusha and Big Sean performed the track during Sean's setlist at the 2012 Summer Jam festival. The song was performed by all four artists at the 2012 BET Awards, with West substituting his verse from "Mercy" with his verses from "Cold" and "New God Flow". Complex and Spin named "Mercy" the best song of 2012. The song received two nominations for Best Rap Song and Best Rap Performance at the 55th Grammy Awards.

Background
The song was originally supposed to be released on Good Friday, but was released a day early on Thursday, following the release of the West and DJ Khaled collaboration track "Cold". The track was premiered by Funkmaster Flex's Hot 97 radio show and was released onto the Internet the following day onto West's official website. The song serves as the first official single from Cruel Summer, an album by West's record label GOOD Music. The release of the track continued West's GOOD Fridays, a music giveaway that provided free MP3 downloads every week, which had been on hiatus since December 2010. The song features Big Sean and Pusha T, rappers both signed to West's GOOD Music, along with 2 Chainz, all delivering a verse each along with West. Speaking about his feature, 2 Chainz stated that "I've done a lot of work with 'Ye for, like, a year now, and it was one of those songs where I called him and I told him, 'Man, play my verse over the phone because I don't remember.' That's a good look to add to the résumé, for real." According to 2 Chainz, he had no idea that the song was going to be a single.

The song was produced by Lifted, with additional production from West, Mike Dean, Mike Will Made It, and Anthony Kilhofer. Lifted had produced the beat in November 2011, and his manager was responsible for playing the beat to West which led to him wanting to work with Lifted. Furthermore, Kanye played the embryotic version to Anthony "The Twilite Tone" Khan and additional production was done including but not limited to samples and the part in which Kanye raps over. Both Pusha T and Big Sean recorded their verses in January 2012 and the song was mixed and finalized in March. Producer Hit-Boy, known for producing West's "Niggas in Paris", commented that "It's fresh, it's new, it's something you haven't heard before. It's elements of trap, but it's just some fresh, new-sounding stuff. I'm excited about it. I wish I did it, but I didn't".

Composition

Sonically, "Mercy" blends Southern rap elements with dancehall vibes. "Mercy" starts with a vocal sampling from the late Fuzzy Jones. The island-laced intro gives way to an eerie-sounding bass track, sparse drums, piano keys and a Scarface film sample. The track features an undulating beat, "threaded through the entire song and it almost mimics an eerie piano. There's also an omnipotent voiceover that shows up every , too." Playing off a hook (sampled from YB's song "Lambo") about a "two-seat Lamborghini". West's posse references Sarah Palin, Rick James and Ms. Pac-Man. At about three minutes in, the song switches up and turns into an electronic dance music track. The beat then slows down, and "despite the jarring difference in timing, it's like a song within a song."

Lyrically, Big Sean picks up where "his "Dance (A$$)" single left off with strip-club-inspired bars, Pusha laments about his "exotic car collection", while Kanye baits "lesser rappers, flashing his riches and model girlfriends." With no real "concept in place", 2 Chainz closes things out with a "free associative verse where spits about his black diamond chain and Louis Vuitton backpack and expensive strains of marijuana." Sean repeats the phrase "swerve" several times throughout the song. LA Weekly journalist Brian McManus noted that the track contains references to suicide doors, which West has previously discussed in his song "Can't Tell Me Nothing". The sample of "Dust a Sound Boy" on "Mercy" was the most popular sample of 2012, according to WhoSampled.

Critical reception
"Mercy" received mostly positive reviews from music critics. Idolator stated that the track "falls somewhere in the middle of the pack among West's previous G.O.O.D. Friday singles – it's nowhere near as much fun as "Good Friday" or as seductive as "Devil in a New Dress". Amy Sciarretto of Popcrush stated that the track was "great", and that "even with four rappers laying down verses on the song, it's a compact, tightly constructed tune that feels like a series of freestyle raps that flow into one another flawlessly." Corban Goble of Stereogum mused that the song "is a giant, lurching thing where the rappers trade bravado-filled verses around a syrup-music inspired hook." Jayson Rodriguez of XXL stated that "the public may have seen this idea and presentation before, but the music is still next level. It's fitting that Kanye could bring together this cast and execute the finished product this well. Still, Wednesday's spontaneous release of "Cold" was a bit much more exhilarating both musically and dramatically." Josiah Hughes of Exclaim! mused that "the track most likely sounds just as you'd expect, all expensive, epic-sounding production, some slowed-down samples and an aggressive synth beat. There's also an appearance of Kanye's obnoxious new trademark huuuuh?" Kia Makarechi of The Huffington Post wrote that "lyrically, 'Mercy' doesn't have much to it, but it's a competent piece of braggadocio."

In 2012 year-end lists, both Complex and Spin named "Mercy" the best song of 2012.
Rolling Stone named the song the 6th best song of 2012. MTV named "Mercy" the seventh best song of 2012. XXL named it one of the top five hip hop songs of 2012. Billboard named it the third best song of 2012. NME named it the 39th best song of the year. "Mercy" was placed at 31 on Club Fonograma's best songs of 2012 list. MSN listed the song eighth on its best 2012 songs list.

"Mercy" debuted on the Billboard Hot 100 at position 38, and achieved a peak position of 13. The song peaked at number one on both the Hot Rap Songs and Hot R&B/Hip-Hop Songs charts. In May 2018, it ranked as West's 14th biggest success on the Hot 100. The song also became a top 50 song in both Canada and in the UK (on its R&B chart). It would go on to win Best Hip-Hop Song of the Year at the 2012 Soul Train Music Awards.

In end of the decade best songs of the 2010s lists; Stereogum placed it at 53,
Crack Magazine listed it at 62, and Uproxx ranked it at 36.

Accolades

Chart performance
"Mercy" sold one million digital copies in the United States by July 2012, and sold two million digital copies by the end of October 2012. It was number-one on the Billboard Hot R&B/Hip-Hop Songs chart for five weeks in July and August 2012.

Music video

West released a black-and-white image of a Lamborghini on his Twitter account, serving as promotion for the video. The music video was directed by prior West collaborator Brandyn Tan, who has helmed prior West videos such as "Welcome to Heartbreak" and "Paranoid". It was filmed in a university at Qatar Foundation's parking garage in Doha, Qatar, while West was producing his short film Cruel Summer. On June 6, West "unleashed the deceptively minimalist video" onto his Website.

The video was shot in a wide frame with the artists in what looks like a "parking garage, rapping as the camera pans across the room" with a Lamborghini Gallardo LP560-4 featured in the background. The video contains numerous cameos by other artists signed to GOOD, including Kid Cudi, Cyhi the Prynce, Teyana Taylor, Hit-Boy, D'banj and Mr. Hudson. Taylor whips her black dress back and forth, Cyhi poses behind a pair of sunglasses, Mr. Hudson stares intently at the camera, and D'banj and Cudi dance along with their own unique moves. In the video Big Sean is wearing a turban-styled headpiece as he raps first. At the end of the clip a Lamborghini Gallardo moves past the screen and the artists are gone from the scene after it passes by. Marc Hogan of Spin praised the video, writing that "as with the track itself, the visuals at first might not appear to involve anything flashy – just West and friends, all lurking about and looking chic in stark black-and-white. But there's one big exception: If the highlight of the audio is the moment where the synths lift off right before West's laconic verse, then that's where the video peaks, too – watch closely, or you'll miss two Wests lip-syncing for the price of one!" Pitchfork Media's Carrie Batton commented that "it's a simple but cinematographically impressive black-and-white clip with lots of leather and keffiyehs and sharp angles."

Live performances
The song was first performed by West at the London stop of his 2012 Watch the Throne Tour, with West performing his portion of the song. Big Sean performed the song with Pusha T and 2 Chainz during his 2012 setlist at Summer Jam, which was described as a "possibly a show-stealing performance". At the 2012 BET Awards, the song was performed by all four rappers. Big Sean, Pusha T, 2 Chainz filed out one by one to deliver their verses, performing in front of a stage-set model of a Lamborghini. Though Los Angeles Times's Randall Roberts noted that it wasn't "until West moved into his hit "Cold" that things got great", with the "music dropping, the rapper moved into a freestyle on "New God Flow" that culminated in a foot-stomping breakdown."

Charts

Weekly charts

Year-end charts

Decade-end charts

Certifications

See also
 List of number-one R&B/hip-hop songs of 2012 (U.S.)
 List of Billboard Hot Rap Songs number ones of the 2010s

References

External links 
 Music video at YouTube

2012 singles
GOOD Music singles
Kanye West songs
Big Sean songs
Pusha T songs
2 Chainz songs
Songs written by Kanye West
Songs written by 2 Chainz
Music videos directed by Nabil Elderkin
Song recordings produced by Hudson Mohawke
Song recordings produced by Mike Will Made It
Def Jam Recordings singles
Black-and-white music videos
Songs written by Pusha T
Songs written by Big Sean
Southern hip hop songs
2011 songs
Posse cuts
Songs about cars
Songs written by Hudson Mohawke